Zhang Yining (born 5 October 1981) is a Chinese table tennis player who retired in 2009. She is considered one of the greatest female players in the sport's history. In terms of achievements, she is one of the most successful female table tennis players (alongside Ding Ning, Deng Yaping, Wang Nan, Li Xiaoxia) having won the gold medal in each of the Table Tennis World Cup, the Table Tennis World Championships, and the Olympic Games.

History
Zhang Yining held the ITTF #1 ranking continuously from 2003 to 2009, except two months in 2008, remaining as a dominant figure in women's table tennis, with four Olympic gold medals, ten World Championships, and four World Cup wins. During the 2008 Beijing Olympics, she was often referred to by commentators as "The Yellow Beast", denoting her dominance in the sport. She uses a specially made Zhang Yining ZLC for her blade made by butterfly, and tenergy 05 for forehand and tenergy 64 for her backhand.

Zhang is a graduate from Beijing Shichahai Sports School, where Li Jiawei of Singapore studied as well.

Zhang was married in October 2009 and has not been present in table tennis tournaments since then. She announced her retirement from international play in 2011 and she went to the United States to study at the University of Wisconsin–Madison and learn to better speak English. This makes her one of few players to retire whilst holding both the World and Olympic titles for singles and team event in table tennis. Zhang also said she would like to introduce to Americans the sport of table tennis.

Since 2010, Zhang serves as the assistant president of the China Table Tennis College in Shanghai.

Successes
 45th World Table Tennis Championships (1999) Women's Single Silver
 45th World Table Tennis Championships (2000) Women's Team Gold
 5th ITTF Pro Tour Grand Finals (2000) Women's Single Gold
 5th Table Tennis World Cup (2001) Women's Single Gold
 46th World Table Tennis Championships (2001) Women's Team Gold
 6th Table Tennis World Cup (2002) Women's Single Gold
 7th ITTF Pro Tour Grand Finals (2002) Women's Single Gold
 47th World Table Tennis Championships (2003) Women's Single Silver, women's Double Gold
 47th World Table Tennis Championships (2004) Women's Team Gold
 Games of the 28th Olympiad (2004) Table Tennis Women's Single Gold, women's Double Gold
 8th Table Tennis World Cup (2004) Women's Single Gold
 48th World Table Tennis Championships (2005) Women's Single Gold, women's Double Gold
 10thNational Games of China (2005) Women's Team Gold, women's Single Gold
 9th Table Tennis World Cup (2005) Women's Single Gold
 10th ITTF Pro Tour Grand Finals (2005) Women's Single Gold
 48th World Table Tennis Championships (2006) Women's Team Gold
 11th ITTF Pro Tour Grand Finals (2006) Women's Single Gold
 49th World Table Tennis Championships (2007)  Women's Double Gold
 11th Table Tennis World Cup (2007) Women's Team Gold
 49th World Table Tennis Championships (2008) Women's Team Gold
 Games of the 29th Olympiad (2008) Table Tennis Women's Single Gold, women's Team Gold
 50th World Table Tennis Championships (2009) Women's Single Gold

Olympic record

2008 Summer Olympics Women's Table Tennis Singles results
Zhang participated in the 2008 Summer Olympics in Beijing, winning gold in both the women's singles and women's team competition. Zhang successfully defended her singles Olympic gold medal, defeating compatriot Wang Nan in the finals 8-11, 13–11, 11–8, 11–8, 11–3.

She was also the women's doubles gold medal winner at the 2004 Summer Olympics.

The following table shows the scores of the women's singles table tennis matches that Zhang Yining played during the Beijing 2008 Olympic Games:

Click here to see further details regarding the 2008 Summer Olympics Table Tennis competition results.

2008 Summer Olympics Opening Ceremony
At the opening ceremony of the 2008 Summer Olympics in Beijing, Zhang took the Olympic Oath on behalf of all competitors at the Games.

See also
List of multiple Olympic gold medalists

References

External links
 Zhang Yining world ranking record at the ITTF
 ITTF Stats for Zhang Yining

1981 births
Living people
Chinese female table tennis players
Olympic gold medalists for China
Olympic table tennis players of China
Table tennis players from Beijing
Table tennis players at the 2004 Summer Olympics
Table tennis players at the 2008 Summer Olympics
Olympic medalists in table tennis
Asian Games medalists in table tennis
Medalists at the 2008 Summer Olympics
Medalists at the 2004 Summer Olympics
Table tennis players at the 2002 Asian Games
Universiade medalists in table tennis
Medalists at the 2002 Asian Games
Asian Games gold medalists for China
Asian Games silver medalists for China
World Table Tennis Championships medalists
Oath takers at the Olympic Games
Universiade gold medalists for China